Tsukigata Dam  is an earthfill dam located in Hokkaido Prefecture in Japan. The dam is used for irrigation. The catchment area of the dam is 32.3 km2. The dam impounds about 43  ha of land when full and can store 4834 thousand cubic meters of water. The construction of the dam was started on 1965 and completed in 1976.

References

Dams in Hokkaido